Naz Aydemir Akyol (born 14 August 1990) is a Turkish volleyball player, widely regarded as one of the best setters in international volleyball. She plays as setter for Fenerbahçe and the Turkey women's national volleyball team. She has won a total of nine Turkish League championships, four with Vakıfbank, three with Eczacıbaşı and two with Fenerbahçe. She has four CEV Champions League championships, winning three with Vakıfbank and one with Fenerbahçe. She also has three FIVB Club World Championship, winning two with Vakıfbank and one with Fenerbahçe. She participated at the 2012 Summer Olympics and 2020 Summer Olympics.

Career
Aydemir has played more than 200 times for all levels of the Turkish national team. She has played 16 seasons of CEV Champions League and achieved an unprecedented record by playing in the CEV Champions League final fours 10 times in a row. She has played for the senior level club volleyball since the 2004–05 season. She was the captain of the youth national team of Turkey who won the silver medal at the 2007 World Championship. In the 2008 edition of the Junior European Championship, she led the Turkish team to a bronze medal and won the Most Valuable Player (MVP) award for the tournament. 

In the 2011-12 edition and 2012-13 edition of the CEV Champions League, Aydemir won the championships and Best Setter awards consecutively, with her clubs Fenerbahçe and Vakıfbank.

Aydemir won her first FIVB Women's Club World Championship gold medal at the 2010 Club World Championship. Fenerbahçe was the first Turkish team to win FIVB Women's Club World Championship. She won her second gold medal at the 2013 Club World Championship playing with Vakıfbank which became second Turkish team to win Club World Championship.

Aydemir won the silver medal in the 2013–14 CEV Champions League when her club VakıfBank defeated Eczacıbaşı VitrA in the semifinal but then lost to Dinamo Kazan in the Championship match. She was the recipient of the tournament's Fair Play special award.

Aydemir won the 2016–17 CEV Champions League gold medal with VakıfBank when her team defeated the Imoco Volley Conegliano. She was also individually awarded Best Setter.

After spending six years at Vakıfbank Istanbul, she took a break from her volleyball career due to her pregnancy. After giving birth to her child, she returned to her old club Fenerbahçe Opet in the 2019–2020 season.

Aydemir was selected for Roster 100 by FIVB as one of the 100 most influential volleyball players between 2010 and 2020, being one of the six female setters in the selection.

Personal life
Aydemir's cousin İlkay Gündoğan is a footballer for Manchester City and the German national team. On 21 August 2013, Naz Aydemir married national basketball player and member of Galatasaray, Cenk Akyol. On 6 November 2018, the couple had a son, Pamir.

Awards

Individuals
 2003 Turkish Youth Championship "Best Setter"
 2004 Youth Balkan Cup "Best Setter"
 2005 Youth European Championship Qualifiers "Most Valuable Player" & "Best Setter"
 2006 Youth Balkan Cup "Most Valuable Player" & "Best Setter"
 2006 Junior Balkan Cup "Best Setter"
 2007 European Youth Olympic Festival "Player with Best Fundamental"
 2007 Youth Black Sea Games "Best Setter"
 2008 Junior European Championship "Most Valuable Player"
 2009-10 Turkish League Final Series "Best Setter"
 2010-11 Turkish League Final Series "Best Setter"
 2011-12 CEV Champions League "Best Setter"
 2012-13 CEV Champions League "Best Setter"
 2012-13 Turkish League Final Series "Best Setter"
 2013-14 CEV Champions League "Fair Play Award"
 2014-15 Turkish League Final Series "Best Setter"
 2015 Montreux Volley Masters "Best Setter"
 2016-17 CEV Champions League "Best Setter"''

National team

Youth team
 2007 Girls Youth World Championship -  Silver Medal

Junior team
 2008 Junior European Championships -  Bronze Medal

Senior team
 2009 Mediterranean Games -  Silver Medal
 2009 European League -  Silver Medal
 2010 European League -  Bronze Medal
 2011 European Championship -  Bronze Medal
 2012 FIVB World Grand Prix -  Bronze Medal
 2013 Mediterranean Games -  Silver Medal
 2015 Montreux Volley Masters -  Champion
 2015 European Games -  Gold Medal
 2017 European Championship -  Bronze Medal
 2019 European Championship -  Silver Medal
 2021 Nations League -   Bronze Medal

Club
 2004-05 CEV Top Teams Cup -  Bronze Medal, with Eczacıbaşı
 2005-06 Turkish League Championship -  Champion, with Eczacıbaşı
 2006-07 Turkish League Championship -  Champion, with Eczacıbaşı
 2007-08 Turkish League Championship -  Champion, with Eczacıbaşı
 2008-09 Turkish Cup -  Champion, with Eczacıbaşı
 2009-10 Turkish Cup -  Champion, with Fenerbahçe Acıbadem
 2009-10 Turkish League Championship -  Champion, with Fenerbahçe Acıbadem
 2009-10 Turkish Super Cup -  Champion, with Fenerbahçe Acıbadem
 2009-10 CEV Champions League -  Runner-Up, with Fenerbahçe Acıbadem
 2010-11 Turkish Super Cup -  Champion, with Fenerbahçe Acıbadem
 2010 FIVB Club World Championship -  Champion, with Fenerbahçe Acıbadem
 2010-11 CEV Champions League -  Bronze medal, with Fenerbahçe Acıbadem
 2010-11 Turkish League Championship -  Champion, with Fenerbahçe Acıbadem
 2011-12 CEV Champions League -  Champion, with Fenerbahçe Universal
 2012-13 Turkish Cup -  Champion, with Vakıfbank Spor Kulübü
 2012-13 Turkish Champions Cup -  Champion, with Vakıfbank Spor Kulübü
 2012-13 CEV Champions League -  Champion, with Vakıfbank Spor Kulübü
 2012-13 Turkish Women's Volleyball League -  Champion, with Vakıfbank Spor Kulübü
 2013 FIVB Club World Championship -  Champion, with Vakıfbank Istanbul
 2013-14 CEV Champions League -  Runner-Up, with VakıfBank İstanbul
 2013-14 Turkish Women's Volleyball League -  Champion, with Vakıfbank İstanbul
 2013-14 Turkish Champions Cup -  Champion, with Vakıfbank İstanbul
 2013-14 Turkish Women's Volleyball Cup  -  Champion, with Vakıfbank İstanbul
 2014-15 CEV Champions League -  Bronze Medal, with  Vakıfbank İstanbul
 2014-15 Turkish Super Cup -  Runner-Up, with  Vakıfbank İstanbul
 2015-16 CEV Champions League -  Runner-Up, with  Vakıfbank İstanbul
 2016 FIVB Club World Championship -  Bronze Medal, with Vakıfbank Istanbul
 2016–17 CEV Champions League -  Champion, with VakıfBank Istanbul
 2017 FIVB Club World Championship -  Champion, with Vakıfbank Istanbul
 2017-18 Turkish Women's Volleyball League -  Champion, with Vakıfbank İstanbul
 2017-18 CEV Champions League -  Champion, with VakıfBank Istanbul
 2021 FIVB Club World Championship -  Bronze Medal, with Fenerbahçe Opet

See also
Turkish women in sports

References

External links

 Official website
 TVF website
 Profil on voleyboltr.com
 
 
 

1990 births
Living people
Volleyball players from Istanbul
Turkish women's volleyball players
Turkey women's international volleyball players
Eczacıbaşı volleyball players
Fenerbahçe volleyballers
VakıfBank S.K. volleyballers
Olympic volleyball players of Turkey
Volleyball players at the 2012 Summer Olympics
European Games gold medalists for Turkey
European Games medalists in volleyball
Volleyball players at the 2015 European Games
Mediterranean Games medalists in volleyball
Mediterranean Games silver medalists for Turkey
Competitors at the 2009 Mediterranean Games
Competitors at the 2013 Mediterranean Games
Volleyball players at the 2020 Summer Olympics
21st-century Turkish sportswomen